Brittney Lawrence (born 18 August 1995) is a footballer who plays as a forward with Pickering FC in League1 Ontario. Born in Canada, she represents the Saint Kitts and Nevis women's national team.

College career
Lawrence attended the Butler Community College and the Oral Roberts University, both in the United States.

Club career
Lawrence played for League1 Ontario side Durham United FA in 2018. One year later, she joined Skoftebyns IF in the Swedish Division 1.

In April 2021, Lawrence signed with FH of the Icelandic 1 . deild kvenna. FOr the season she netted 4 goals in 17 league matches and one goal in 4 matches in the Icelandic Cup.

In 2022, she played with Pickering FC (who she previously played with when they were known as Durham United) in League1 Ontario.

International career
Lawrence represented Saint Kitts and Nevis at the 2014 CONCACAF Women's U-20 Championship qualifying. At senior level, she played the 2018 CONCACAF Women's Championship qualification.

International goals
Scores and results list Saint Kitts and Nevis's goal tally first

References

External links

1995 births
Living people
Black Canadian women's soccer players
Butler Community College alumni
Canadian expatriate women's soccer players
Canadian expatriate sportspeople in Iceland
Canadian expatriate sportspeople in the United States
Canadian expatriate sportspeople in Sweden
Canadian people of Saint Kitts and Nevis descent
Sportspeople of Saint Kitts and Nevis descent
Canadian women's soccer players
Expatriate women's soccer players in the United States
FH women's football players
League1 Ontario (women) players
Oral Roberts Golden Eagles women's soccer players
Saint Kitts and Nevis expatriate sportspeople in Iceland
Saint Kitts and Nevis expatriate sportspeople in the United States
Saint Kitts and Nevis expatriate sportspeople in Sweden
Saint Kitts and Nevis expatriate women's footballers
Saint Kitts and Nevis women's footballers
Saint Kitts and Nevis women's international footballers
Soccer players from Toronto
Sportspeople from Scarborough, Toronto
Women's association football forwards
Pickering FC (women) players